Wolfgang Hamberger (born 29 July 1942) is a German sports shooter. He competed in the men's 50 metre running target event at the 1976 Summer Olympics.

References

External links
 

1942 births
Living people
German male sport shooters
Olympic shooters of West Germany
Shooters at the 1976 Summer Olympics
Sportspeople from Giessen